Major General Bertram Meryl Hoffmeister,  (15 May 1907 – 4 December 1999) was a Canadian Army officer, businessman, and conservationist. He served with distinction during the last two years of the Second World War, becoming, in Jack Granatstein's words, "the best Canadian fighting general of the war", rising from captain and a company commander in 1939 to major-general and commander of the 5th Canadian (Armoured) Division in 1944.

Early life and career
Born in Vancouver, British Columbia to parents Louis and Flora, Hoffmeister was a sales manager with the Canadian White Pine Co. Ltd. in Vancouver. He enlisted with the Non-Permanent Active Militia (NPAM, the Canadian Army Reserve Force) in 1927. He was promoted captain in 1934. After he was promoted to major, in 1939, he was made officer commanding a company of the Seaforth Highlanders of Canada, who went to England in 1939, the year the Second World War began, as part of Andrew McNaughton's 1st Canadian Division.

Second World War

Hoffmeister attended the Canadian Junior War Staff courses at the Royal Military College of Canada in Kingston, Ontario. On 11 October 1942, he was promoted to lieutenant colonel. In 1943, he was awarded the Distinguished Service Order (DSO) while fighting in Sicily as a battalion commander. He received a Bar to the DSO the following year.

In October 1943, promoted to brigadier, Hoffmeister was named commanding officer of the 2nd Canadian Infantry Brigade, which fought in the early stages of the Italian campaign, including at the Battle of Ortona towards the end of the year.

On 20 March 1944, as a reward for his successful command of the 2nd Brigade, he was promoted to major general and made general officer commanding (GOC) the 5th Canadian Armoured Division. After VE-Day, he was made GOC of the 6th Canadian Division (Canadian Pacific Force) which disbanded after the atomic bombings of Japan. Hoffmeister retired from active service in September 1945. That same year, he was made a Grand Officer of the Order of Orange-Nassau with swords as well as a Companion of the Order of the Bath, and a Commander of the Order of the British Empire. In 1947, he was made a Commander of the Legion of Merit.

Post-war
After the war, Hoffmeister became president of MacMillan Bloedel Limited in 1949 and was its chairman from 1956 to 1958. From 1958 to 1961, he was British Columbia's agent general in London. From 1961 to 1968, he was chairman of the Council of Forest Industries of British Columbia, an association for the British Columbia interior forest industry. From 1971 to 1991 he was the founding chairman of the Nature Trust of British Columbia, a non-profit land conservation organization.

In 1982, Hoffmeister was made an Officer of the Order of Canada.

References

Bibliography

External links

Generals of World War II
Canada's 25 Most Renowned Military Leaders

1907 births
1999 deaths
Businesspeople from Vancouver
Companions of the Order of the Bath
Canadian Commanders of the Order of the British Empire
Canadian Companions of the Distinguished Service Order
Canadian conservationists
Officers of the Order of Canada
Commanders of the Legion of Merit
Grand Officers of the Order of Orange-Nassau
20th-century Canadian businesspeople
Canadian Army generals of World War II
People from Vancouver
Canadian Militia officers
Canadian generals
Canadian military personnel from British Columbia
Seaforth Highlanders of Canada officers
Seaforth Highlanders of Canada soldiers
Seaforth Highlanders of Canada